The Texas Longhorns women's track and field program is coached by Edrick Floréal. Other notable coaches have included Beverly Kearney, who has guided the Lady Longhorns to six NCAA Championships: Indoor Championships in 1998, 1999, and 2006, and Outdoor Championships in 1998, 1999, and 2005; and Terry Crawford, whose teams won Indoor Championships in 1986, 1988, and 1990, and Outdoor Championships in 1982 and 1986. Crawford's athletes also won the 1986 Women's Cross Country Championship. The program's first title was the 1982 AIAW outdoor track and field championship.

In the summer of 2013 the men's and women's programs were combined under one head coach.

The Longhorn track and field programs have produced numerous Olympians for various nations. Female Olympic medalists have included Michelle Carter (athlete) (USA, shot put, 2016), Sanya Richards-Ross (2012: USA, gold, 400 meters and 4 x 400 meter relay; 2008, bronze, 400 meters and gold, 4 x 400 meter relay, 2008), Moushami Robinson (USA, gold, 4 × 400 meter relay, 2004), Sandie Richards (Jamaica, silver, 4 × 400 m relay, 2000 and 2004), Merlene Frazer (Jamaica, silver, 4 × 100 m relay, 2000), Nanceen Perry (USA, bronze, 4 × 100 m relay, 2000), Carlette Guidry (USA, gold, 4 × 100 m relay, 1992 and 1996), Juliet Cuthbert (Jamaica, silver, 100m and 200m, 1992 and bronze, 4 × 100 m relay, 1996), and Nikole Mitchell (Jamaica, bronze, 4 × 100 m relay, 1996).

Courtney Okolo became the first Longhorn to win The Bowerman, an award that honors collegiate track & field's most outstanding athlete of the year. In 2016, she became the first female collegian to run sub-50 seconds in the 400 meters, in turn lowering her own collegiate record to 49.71. Her senior season also included an undefeated record against collegians and four NCAA titles (two individual, two relay).

Head coaches
Source

Yearly Record
Source

Note: The 2020 season was canceled after the Big 12 Indoor Championships due to the Coronavirus Pandemic, the Big 12 Outdoor and NCAA Championships were not held.

NCAA Individual Event Champions

Source

Conference Individual Event Champions

SourceAs of May 16, 2022

See also
Texas Longhorns men's track and field
Texas Longhorns men's cross country
Texas Longhorns women's cross country

References

College track and field teams in the United States
Women's sports in Texas